Mezná may refer to places in the Czech Republic:

Mezná (Pelhřimov District), a municipality and village in the Vysočina Region
Mezná (Tábor District), a municipality and village in the South Bohemian Region
Mezná, a village and part of Hřensko in the Ústí nad Labem Region